Yizheng Chemical Fiber, full name "Sinopec Yizheng Chemical Fiber Company Limited", abbreviated as "Yizheng", is a subsidiary company of Sinopec, which is engaged in sales and production of fibers and fiber materials on Mainland China. The headquarters of the company is located at Yizheng City, Jiangsu Province.

There have been hopes that Sinopec, Yizheng's parent company, will process share reform and privatize Yizheng Chemical Fiber and Sinopec Shanghai Petrochemical, but the plan has not been finalized.

Yizheng has both A share and H share listed in Shanghai Stock Exchange and Hong Kong Stock Exchange respectively, with the greatest difference between A and H share prices currently. It also has the largest 6tr EUhistorical P/E ratio among all H shares, currently more than 200 times.

References

External links
Sinopec Yizheng Chemical Fiber Company Limited
Sinopec Yizheng Chemical Fiber Company Limited Overseas Regulatory Announcement

Companies listed on the Hong Kong Stock Exchange
Companies listed on the Shanghai Stock Exchange
Government-owned companies of China
Companies based in Jiangsu
Companies established in 1993
Chemical companies of China
Petrochemical companies
H shares
Sinopec